The 1936 Nevada Wolf Pack football team was an American football team that represented the University of Nevada in the Far Western Conference (FWC) during the 1936 college football season. In their first season under head coach Doug Dashiell, the team compiled a 4–4 record (2–2 FWC) and finished third in the conference.

Schedule

References

Nevada
Nevada Wolf Pack football seasons
Nevada Wolf Pack football